Lalkuan Junction railway station is the main railway station located in Lalkuan in Nainital district, Uttarakhand.

Background
Its code is LKU. It serves Lalkuan city.

Lines
The station was first connected with city of Haridwar through a branch line in 1886, when the Awadh and Rohilakhand Railway line was extended through Roorkee to Saharanpur which was later extended to Dehradun in 1900.

External links

Railway stations in Nainital district
Izzatnagar railway division
Transport in Haldwani-Kathgodam
Railway junction stations in Uttarakhand